MULEA (Magadh University Late Exam Aandolan) is a social media campaign primarily on YouTube and Twitter.

It was started as the Students were fed up from the Magadh University, Government of Bihar's lethargy and Central Government's non intervention in the critical matter of youth.

Prior to starting the campaign the Students visited every high offices of the state ranging from Governor, Chief Minister,  Bihar State Human Rights Commission.

They were also denied to hold peaceful protest by the administration citing the Model Code of Conduct in place for Lok Sabha Election, 2019.

Relevance of the Campaign 
Due to the pressure of the campaign the university started taking exams in the month of may  when the Model Code of Conduct was in place due to Lok Sabha election citing which the university had postponed the already delayed exams. Subsequently, it also conducted the Traditional courses exams of 2016–19 session in the month of June 2019. Further, it also conducted the first year exam of UG 2017–20 sessions which was running by two year late.

Further, taking cognisance of the lackadaisical approach of the University the then Governor of Bihar Lalji Tandon removed the exam controller and some other officers of the university.

Subsequently, the Pro Vice Chancellor of the University also had to resign.

This is for the first time in the history of the world that such a campaign  has taken place over YouTube.

This campaign is one of the most innovative campaign which has taken place over YouTube. The struggling youths used the social media space to their advantage which has saved nearly 5 lakh students career from moving into darkness. For this effort they have been loudly applauded online as well as offline.

The campaign was started by Abhisek Gupta and his friends Avinash Rauniyar, Subham Kumar, Aadit Raj, Mohan Singh among others.

Aftermath of the campaign
People from across the world have come into their support by sending videos in their support. The campaign went nearly viral on social media and also some print and electronic media reported it.
The #mulea also trended on Twitter.
Their lives are at dark. They have called themselves Zombies in a YouTube video.

References

Magadh University
Social media campaigns
2010s in Bihar